Djerba–Zarzis International Airport  is the international airport serving the island of Djerba in Tunisia. The airport began operation in 1970 and today is an important destination for seasonal leisure flights.

Airlines and destinations
The following airlines operate regular scheduled and charter flights at Djerba–Zarzis Airport:

Accidents and incidents
On 6 August 2005, Tuninter Flight 1153, a Tuninter ATR-72 en route from Bari to Djerba, Tunisia, ditched into the Mediterranean Sea about 18 miles from the city of Palermo. 16 of the 39 people on board died. The accident resulted from engine fuel starvation that resulted from the installation of the wrong fuel quantity indicator. The fuel quantity indicator installed had been calibrated for the smaller ATR-42 aircraft and showed significantly more fuel than was actually in the tank of the larger ATR 72. When the aircraft ran out of fuel, the indicator still showed 1800 kilograms of fuel remaining thus confusing the crew for several minutes. Both engines stopped and the crew was forced to ditch the airliner in the sea.
The airport was a stopover for Air Berlin chartered flight AB7377, which was involved in a bomb scare. During loading at Hosea Kutako International Airport in Namibia, a suitcase was discovered that contained a clock, batteries and a firing mechanism. Upon closer inspection, it was discovered that the object was part of a test to assess the quality of airport screening procedures. The A330-200 aircraft was examined with an explosives sniffer dog, before it was allowed to fly to Munich Airport, via a stopover in Djerba.

References

External links
Tunisian Civil Aviation and Airports Authority (OACA)
 
 

Airports in Tunisia
Djerba
Airports established in 1970